"I See It Now" is a song written by Larry Boone, Paul Nelson and Woody Lee, and recorded by American country music artist Tracy Lawrence.  It was released in August 1994 as the first single from his album of the same name. It peaked at number 2 on the U.S. Billboard Hot Country Singles & Tracks chart and reached number 5 on the Canadian RPM Country Tracks chart. It also peaked at number 84 on the U.S. Billboard Hot 100 chart.

Music video
The music video was directed by Marc Ball, and premiered in late 1994. It begins with the bank explosion from the "Renegades, Rebels and Rogues" video, which Lawrence is "leaped" to a high-school dance, where he and his band perform the song. As the song ends, Lawrence dances with a pretty young woman on the dance floor, which is then "leaped" to the next video for "As Any Fool Can See". It was one of many music videos Lawrence had filmed in the mid 1990s (with Marc Ball as director) that interpreted the television series Quantum Leap.

Chart performance
The song made its debut at number 60 on the Billboard Hot Country Singles & Tracks chart dated September 10, 1994, and charted for twenty weeks on that chart. It reached number 2 on the chart dated November 19, 1994, being held from the top spot by Mary Chapin Carpenter's "Shut Up and Kiss Me".

Charts

Year-end charts

References

1994 singles
1994 songs
Tracy Lawrence songs
Songs written by Larry Boone
Song recordings produced by James Stroud
Atlantic Records singles
Songs written by Paul Nelson (songwriter)